Shafiq Afifi bin Suhaimi (born 6 August 1999) is a Malaysian footballer who plays as a goalkeeper for Penang.

Honours
Malaysia U19
 AFF U-19 Youth Championship: 2018

References

External links
 

1999 births
Living people
People from Perak
Malaysian footballers
Malaysia Super League players
PKNP FC players
Penang F.C. players
Association football goalkeepers